C.G.P. is the fifty-fifth studio album by Chet Atkins. It was released in 1988 by Columbia Records. The initials in the title refer to the Atkins-coined title "Certified Guitar Player", a moniker he assigned not only to himself but other guitarists he admired and felt contributed to the legacy of guitar playing.

Atkins performs a rare vocal tune on the live rendition of "I Still Can't Say Goodbye".

Reception

Allmusic music critic Richard S. Ginell wrote of the album; "...the level of material is somewhat higher than it had been on some earlier albums, boosted by a handful of superior rock tunes."

Track listing
 "Chinook Winds" (Chet Atkins, Darryl Dybka) – 4:40
 "Put Your Clothes On" (Atkins, Johnny Gimble) – 4:51
 "Imagine"  (John Lennon) – 4:05
 "Light-Hearted Lisa" (T. J. White) – 4:31
 "Knucklebusters" (Atkins, John Knowles) – 5:18
 "Jethreaux" (Atkins, Burns, Dybka) – 3:55
 "Which Way del Vecchio?" (Dybka) – 4:52
 "Daydream" (John Sebastian) – 3:42
 "Mockingbird Variations" (Atkins, Shel Silverstein) – 5:06
 "I Still Can't Say Goodbye" (live) (Bob Blinn, Jimmy Moore) – 4:05

Personnel
Chet Atkins - guitar; vocals on “I Still Can’t Say Goodbye”
Darryl Dybka - keyboards, drum programming, synthesizer
Johnny Gimble - fiddle
Steve Gibson - guitar
Mark Hammond - drum programming
Jim Horn - saxophone
Mike Haynes - trumpet, flugelhorn
David Hungate - bass
Clayton Ivey - keyboards
Mark Knopfler - guitar on "Imagine"
Mike Lawler - synthesizer
Larrie Londin - drums
Randy McCormick - synthesizer
Terry McMillan - percussion
Larry Paxton - bass
George Tidwell - trumpet, flugelhorn
Don Sheffield - trumpet, flugelhorn

Production
Chet Atkins – producer
David Hungate – producer
Daryl Dybka – producer
Joseph Bogan – mixing
Denny Purcell – mastering
Rick Horton – editing
Don Cobb – engineer
Mike Poston – engineer, mixing
David Michael Kennedy – photography
Garrison Keillor – liner notes

References

External links
 Imagine Video with Mark Knopfler
 I Still Can't Say Goodbye video - Live 1987

1988 albums
Chet Atkins albums
Albums produced by Chet Atkins
Columbia Records albums